This is a list of the bird species recorded in Martinique.  Martinique is an overseas department of France located in the Windward Islands, part of the Lesser Antilles in the Caribbean. The avifauna of Martinique included a total of 240 species according to Bird Checklists of the World as of July 2022. Of them, 17 have been introduced by humans and 148 are rare or accidental. One existing species is endemic, one species has been extirpated, and another is believed to be extinct. 

This list is presented in the taxonomic sequence of the Check-list of North and Middle American Birds, 7th edition through the 63rd Supplement, published by the American Ornithological Society (AOS). Common and scientific names are also those of the Check-list, except that the common names of families are from the Clements taxonomy because the AOS list does not include them. French names in parentheses are also from the Check-list.
 
The following tags have been used to highlight several categories. The tags and notes on population status are also from Bird Checklists of the World.

 (A) Accidental - a species that rarely or accidentally occurs in Martinique
 (I) Introduced - a species introduced directly to Martinique or elsewhere in the New World

Ducks, geese, and waterfowl
Order: AnseriformesFamily: Anatidae

Anatidae includes the ducks and most duck-like waterfowl, such as geese and swans. These birds are adapted to an aquatic existence with webbed feet, flattened bills, and feathers that are excellent at shedding water due to an oily coating.

Black-bellied whistling-duck, Dendrocygna autumnalis (A)  
West Indian whistling-duck, Dendrocygna arborea (A) (near-threatened)
Fulvous whistling-duck, Dendrocygna bicolor (A)
Common shelduck, Tadorna tadorna (A)
Muscovy duck, Cairina moschata (I)
Garganey, Spatula querquedula (A)
Blue-winged teal, Spatula discors (A)
Cinnamon teal, Spatula cyanoptera (A)
Northern shoveler, Spatula clypeata (A)
Gadwall, Mareca strepera (A)
Eurasian wigeon, Mareca penelope (A)  
American wigeon, Mareca americana (A)
Mallard, Anas platyrhynchos (A)  
White-cheeked pintail, Anas bahamensis (A)
Northern pintail, Anas acuta (A)
Green-winged teal, Anas crecca (A)
Ring-necked duck, Aythya collaris  (A)
Lesser scaup, Aythya affinis (A)
Hooded merganser, Lophodytes cucullatus (A)  
Masked duck, Nomonyx dominicus  
Ruddy duck, Oxyura jamaicensis (A)

Pheasants, grouse, and allies
Order: GalliformesFamily: Phasianidae

Phasianidae consists of the pheasants and their allies. These are terrestrial species, variable in size but generally plump with broad relatively short wings. Many species are gamebirds or have been domesticated as a food source for humans.

Red junglefowl, Gallus gallus (I)

Flamingos
Order: PhoenicopteriformesFamily: Phoenicopteridae

Flamingos filter-feed on shellfish and algae. Their oddly shaped beaks are specially adapted to separate mud and silt from the food they consume and, uniquely, are used upside-down.

American flamingo, Phoenicopterus ruber (A)

Grebes
Order: PodicipediformesFamily: Podicipedidae

Grebes are small to medium-large freshwater diving birds. They have lobed toes and are excellent swimmers and divers. However, they have their feet placed far back on the body, making them quite ungainly on land.

Pied-billed grebe, Podilymbus podiceps (A)

Pigeons and doves
Order: ColumbiformesFamily: Columbidae

Pigeons and doves are stout-bodied birds with short necks and short slender bills with a fleshy cere.

Rock pigeon, Columba livia (I)
Scaly-naped pigeon, Patagioenas squamosa
White-crowned pigeon, Patagioenas leucocephala (A) (Near-threatened)
Eurasian collared-dove, Streptopelia decaocto (I)
Common ground dove, Columbina passerina
Ruddy quail-dove, Geotrygon montana (A)
Bridled quail-dove, Geotrygon mystacea (A)
White-winged dove, Zenaida asiatica (A)
Zenaida dove, Zenaida aurita
Eared dove, Zenaida auriculata (A)

Cuckoos
Order: CuculiformesFamily: Cuculidae

The family Cuculidae includes cuckoos, roadrunners, and anis. These birds are of variable size with slender bodies, long tails, and strong legs. The Old World cuckoos are brood parasites.

Smooth-billed ani, Crotophaga ani (A)
Yellow-billed cuckoo, Coccyzus americanus (A)
Mangrove cuckoo, Coccyzus minor

Nightjars and allies
Order: CaprimulgiformesFamily: Caprimulgidae

Nightjars are medium-sized nocturnal birds that usually nest on the ground. They have long wings, short legs, and very short bills. Most have small feet, of little use for walking, and long pointed wings. Their soft plumage is camouflaged to resemble bark or leaves.

Common nighthawk,  Chordeiles minor
Antillean nighthawk, Chordeiles gundlachii (A)
White-tailed nightjar, Hydropsalis cayennensis (A)

Swifts
Order: ApodiformesFamily: Apodidae

Swifts are small birds which spend the majority of their lives flying. These birds have very short legs and never settle voluntarily on the ground, perching instead only on vertical surfaces. Many swifts have long swept-back wings which resemble a crescent or boomerang.

Black swift, Cypseloides niger (vulnerable)
White-collared swift, Streptoprocne zonaris (A)
Lesser Antillean swift, Chaetura martinica
Short-tailed swift, Chaetura brachyura (A)

Hummingbirds
Order: ApodiformesFamily: Trochilidae

Hummingbirds are small birds capable of hovering in mid-air due to the rapid flapping of their wings. They are the only birds that can fly backwards.

Purple-throated carib, Eulampis jugularis
Green-throated carib, Eulampis holosericeus
Blue-headed hummingbird, Riccordia bicolor
Antillean crested hummingbird, Orthorhyncus cristatus

Rails, gallinules, and coots
Order: GruiformesFamily: Rallidae

Rallidae is a large family of small to medium-sized birds which includes the rails, crakes, coots, and gallinules. Typically they inhabit dense vegetation in damp environments near lakes, swamps, or rivers. In general they are shy and secretive birds, making them difficult to observe. Most species have strong legs and long toes which are well adapted to soft uneven surfaces. They tend to have short, rounded wings and to be weak fliers.

Clapper rail, Rallus crepitans (A)
Sora, Porzana carolina (A)
Common gallinule, Gallinula galeata
American coot, Fulica americana (A)
Purple gallinule, Porphyrio martinicus (A)

Stilts and avocets
Order: CharadriiformesFamily:

Recurvirostridae is a family of large wading birds which includes the avocets and stilts. The avocets have long legs and long up-curved bills. The stilts have extremely long legs and long, thin, straight bills.

Black-necked stilt, Himantopus mexicanus

Oystercatchers
Order: CharadriiformesFamily: Haematopodidae

The oystercatchers are large and noisy plover-like birds, with strong bills used for smashing or prising open molluscs.

American oystercatcher, Haematopus palliatus (A)

Plovers and lapwings
Order: CharadriiformesFamily: Charadriidae

The family Charadriidae includes the plovers, dotterels, and lapwings. They are small to medium-sized birds with compact bodies, short thick necks, and long, usually pointed, wings. They are found in open country worldwide, mostly in habitats near water.

Northern lapwing, Vanellus vanellus (A) (Near-threatened)
Black-bellied plover, Pluvialis squatarola
American golden-plover, Pluvialis dominica (A)
Killdeer, Charadrius vociferus (A)
Semipalmated plover, Charadrius semipalmatus
Piping plover, Charadrius melodus (A) (Near-threatened)
Little ringed plover, Charadrius dubius (A)
Wilson's plover, Charadrius wilsonia (A)
Collared plover, Charadrius collaris (A)
Snowy plover, Charadrius nivosus (A) (Near-threatened)

Sandpipers and allies
Order: CharadriiformesFamily: Scolopacidae

Scolopacidae is a large diverse family of small to medium-sized shorebirds including the sandpipers, curlews, godwits, shanks, tattlers, woodcocks, snipes, dowitchers, and phalaropes. The majority of these species eat small invertebrates picked out of the mud or soil. Variation in length of legs and bills enables multiple species to feed in the same habitat, particularly on the coast, without direct competition for food.

Upland sandpiper, Bartramia longicauda
Whimbrel, Numenius phaeopus
Eskimo curlew, Numenius borealis (A) (believed extinct)
Long-billed curlew, Numenius americanus (A)
Hudsonian godwit, Limosa haemastica (A)
Marbled godwit, Limosa fedoa (A)
Ruddy turnstone, Arenaria interpres
Red knot, Calidris canutus (A) (Near-threatened)
Ruff, Calidris pugnax (A)
Stilt sandpiper, Calidris himantopus (A)
Curlew sandpiper, Calidris ferruginea (A)
Sanderling, Calidris alba (A)
Dunlin, Calidris alpina (A)
Baird's sandpiper, Calidris bairdii (A)
Least sandpiper, Calidris minutilla
White-rumped sandpiper, Calidris fuscicollis (A)
Buff-breasted sandpiper, Calidris subruficollis (Near-threatened)
Pectoral sandpiper, Calidris melanotos (A)
Semipalmated sandpiper, Calidris pusilla (Near-threatened)
Western sandpiper, Calidris mauri (A)
Short-billed dowitcher, Limnodromus griseus (A)
Long-billed dowitcher, Limnodromus scolopaceus (A)
Wilson's snipe, Gallinago delicata (A)
Spotted sandpiper, Actitis macularia
Solitary sandpiper, Tringa solitaria (A)
Lesser yellowlegs, Tringa flavipes
Willet, Tringa semipalmata
Greater yellowlegs, Tringa melanoleuca
Wilson's phalarope, Phalaropus tricolor (A)

Skuas and jaegers
Order: CharadriiformesFamily: Stercorariidae

The family Stercorariidae are, in general, medium to large birds, typically with gray or brown plumage, often with white markings on the wings. They nest on the ground in temperate and arctic regions and are long-distance migrants.

Great skua, Stercorarius skua (A)
South polar skua, Stercorarius maccormicki (A)
Pomarine jaeger, Stercorarius pomarinus (A)
Parasitic jaeger, Stercorarius parasiticus (A)
Long-tailed jaeger, Stercorarius longicaudus (A)

Gulls, terns, and skimmers
Order: CharadriiformesFamily: Laridae

Laridae is a family of medium to large seabirds and includes gulls, kittiwakes, terns and skimmers. They are typically gray or white, often with black markings on the head or wings. They have longish bills and webbed feet. Terns are a group of generally medium to large seabirds typically with gray or white plumage, often with black markings on the head. Most terns hunt fish by diving but some pick insects off the surface of fresh water. Terns are generally long-lived birds, with several species known to live in excess of 30 years. Skimmers are a small family of tropical tern-like birds. They have an elongated lower mandible which they use to feed by flying low over the water surface and skimming the water for small fish.

Bonaparte's gull, Chroicocephalus philadelphia (A)
Black-headed gull, Chroicocephalus ridibundus (A)
Laughing gull, Leucophaeus atricilla
Ring-billed gull, Larus delawarensis (A)
Herring gull, Larus argentatus (A)
Lesser black-backed gull, Larus fuscus (A)
Great black-backed gull, Larus marinus
Brown noddy, Anous stolidus
Sooty tern, Onychoprion fuscatus
Bridled tern, Onychoprion anaethetus
Least tern, Sternula antillarum (A)
Gull-billed tern, Gelochelidon nilotica (A)
Caspian tern, Hydroprogne caspia (A)
Black tern, Chlidonias niger (A)
Roseate tern, Sterna dougallii
Common tern, Sterna hirundo (A)
Royal tern, Thalasseus maximus
Sandwich tern, Thalasseus sandvicensis (A)

Tropicbirds
Order: PhaethontiformesFamily: Phaethontidae

Tropicbirds are slender white birds of tropical oceans with exceptionally long central tail feathers. Their heads and long wings have black markings.

White-tailed tropicbird, Phaethon lepturus
Red-billed tropicbird, Phaethon aethereus

Albatrosses
Order: ProcellariiformesFamily: Diomedeidae

The albatrosses are among the largest of flying birds, and the great albatrosses from the genus Diomedea have the largest wingspans of any extant birds.

Black-browed albatross, Thalassarche melanophris (A)

Southern storm-petrels
Order: ProcellariiformesFamily: Oceanitidae

The southern storm-petrels are relatives of the petrels and are the smallest seabirds. They feed on planktonic crustaceans and small fish picked from the surface, typically while hovering. The flight is fluttering and sometimes bat-like.

Wilson's storm-petrel, Oceanites oceanicus (A)

Northern storm-petrels
Order: ProcellariiformesFamily: Hydrobatidae

Though the members of this family are similar in many respects to the southern storm-petrels, including their general appearance and habits, there are enough genetic differences to warrant their placement in a separate family.

Leach's storm-petrel, Hydrobates leucorhous (A) (vulnerable)
Band-rumped storm-petrel, Hydrobates castro (A)

Shearwaters and petrels
Order: ProcellariiformesFamily: Procellariidae

The procellariids are the main group of medium-sized "true petrels", characterised by united nostrils with medium septum and a long outer functional primary.

Cory's shearwater, Calonectris diomedea (A)
Sooty shearwater, Ardenna grisea (A) (Near-threatened)
Great shearwater, Ardenna gravis (A)
Manx shearwater, Puffinus puffinus (A)
Audubon's shearwater, Puffinus lherminieri
Black-capped petrel, Pterodroma hasitata (endangered)

Storks
Order: CiconiiformesFamily: Ciconiidae

Storks are large, long-legged, long-necked, wading birds with long, stout bills. Storks are mute, but bill-clattering is an important mode of communication at the nest. Their nests can be large and may be reused for many years. Many species are migratory.

White stork, Ciconia ciconia (A)

Frigatebirds
Order: SuliformesFamily: Fregatidae

Frigatebirds are large seabirds usually found over tropical oceans. They are large, black-and-white, or completely black, with long wings and deeply forked tails. The males have colored inflatable throat pouches. They do not swim or walk and cannot take off from a flat surface. Having the largest wingspan-to-body-weight ratio of any bird, they are essentially aerial, able to stay aloft for more than a week.

Magnificent frigatebird, Fregata magnificens

Boobies and gannets
Order: SuliformesFamily: Sulidae

The sulids comprise the gannets and boobies. Both groups are medium to large coastal seabirds that plunge-dive for fish.

Masked booby, Sula dactylatra (A)
Brown booby, Sula leucogaster
Red-footed booby, Sula sula (A)
Northern gannet, Morus bassanus (A)

Pelicans
Order: PelecaniformesFamily: Pelecanidae

Pelicans are large water birds with a distinctive pouch under their beak. As with other members of the order Pelecaniformes, they have webbed feet with four toes.

Brown pelican, Pelecanus occidentalis (A)

Herons, egrets, and bitterns
Order: PelecaniformesFamily: Ardeidae

The family Ardeidae contains the bitterns, herons, and egrets. Herons and egrets are medium to large wading birds with long necks and legs. Bitterns tend to be shorter necked and more wary. Members of Ardeidae fly with their necks retracted, unlike other long-necked birds such as storks, ibises, and spoonbills.

American bittern, Botaurus lentiginosus (A)
Least bittern, Ixobrychus exilis (A)
Great blue heron, Ardea herodias (A)
Gray heron, Ardea cinerea (A)
Great egret, Ardea alba
Little egret, Egretta garzetta (A) 
Snowy egret, Egretta thula
Little blue heron, Egretta caerulea (A)
Tricolored heron, Egretta tricolor (A)
Cattle egret, Bubulcus ibis
Green heron, Butorides virescens
Striated heron, Butorides striata (A)
Black-crowned night-heron, Nycticorax nycticorax
Yellow-crowned night-heron, Nyctanassa violacea

Ibises and spoonbills
Order: PelecaniformesFamily: Threskiornithidae

Threskiornithidae is a family of large terrestrial and wading birds which includes the ibises and spoonbills. They have long, broad wings with 11 primary and about 20 secondary feathers. They are strong fliers and despite their size and weight, very capable soarers.

Scarlet ibis, Eudocimus ruber (A)
Glossy ibis, Plegadis falcinellus (A
Eurasian spoonbill, Platalea leucorodia (A)
Roseate spoonbill, Platalea ajaja (A)

Osprey
Order: AccipitriformesFamily: Pandionidae

The family Pandionidae contains only one species, the osprey. The osprey is a medium-large raptor which is a specialist fish-eater with a worldwide distribution.

Osprey, Pandion haliaetus (A)

Hawks, eagles, and kites
Order: AccipitriformesFamily: Accipitridae

Accipitridae is a family of birds of prey which includes hawks, eagles, kites, harriers, and Old World vultures. These birds have powerful hooked beaks for tearing flesh from their prey, strong legs, powerful talons, and keen eyesight.

Swallow-tailed kite, Elanoides forficatus (A)
Northern harrier, Circus hudonius (A)
Broad-winged hawk, Buteo platypterus

Owls
Order: StrigiformesFamily: Strigidae

Typical or "true" owls are small to large solitary nocturnal birds of prey. They have large forward-facing eyes and ears, a hawk-like beak, and a conspicuous circle of feathers around each eye called a facial disk.

Burrowing owl, Athene cunicularia (extirpated)

Kingfishers
Order: CoraciiformesFamily: Alcedinidae

Water kingfishers are medium-sized birds with large heads, long, pointed bills, short legs, and stubby tails.

Ringed kingfisher, Megaceryle torquata (A)
Belted kingfisher, Megaceryle alcyon (A)

Falcons and caracaras
Order: FalconiformesFamily: Falconidae

Falconidae is a family of diurnal birds of prey. They differ from hawks, eagles, and kites in that they kill with their beaks instead of their talons.

Eurasian kestrel, Falco tinnunculus (A)
American kestrel, Falco sparverius
Merlin, Falco columbarius (A)
Peregrine falcon, Falco peregrinus

Old World parrots
Order: PsittaciformesFamily: Psittaculidae

Parrots are small to large birds with a characteristic curved beak. Their upper mandibles have slight mobility in the joint with the skull and they have a generally erect stance. All parrots are zygodactyl, having the four toes on each foot placed two at the front and two to the back.

Rose-ringed parakeet, Eupsittula pertinax (I)

New World and African parrots
Order: PsittaciformesFamily: Psittacidae

Parrots are small to large birds with a characteristic curved beak. Their upper mandibles have slight mobility in the joint with the skull and they have a generally erect stance. All parrots are zygodactyl, having the four toes on each foot placed two at the front and two to the back.

Martinique parrot, Amazona martinicana (extinct)
Orange-winged parrot, Amazona amazonica (I)

Tyrant flycatchers
Order: PasseriformesFamily: Tyrannidae

Tyrant flycatchers are passerine birds which occur throughout North and South America. They superficially resemble the Old World flycatchers, but are more robust and have stronger bills. They do not have the sophisticated vocal capabilities of the songbirds. Most, but not all, have plain coloring. As the name implies, most are insectivorous.

Caribbean elaenia, Elaenia martinica
Yellow-bellied elaenia, Elaenia flavogaster (A)
Stolid flycatcher, Myiarchus stolidus (A)
Lesser Antillean pewee, Contopus latirostris
Gray kingbird, Tyrannus dominicensis (A)
Fork-tailed flycatcher, Tyrannus savana
Lesser Antillean flycatcher, Myiarchus oberi

Vireos, shrike-babblers, and erpornis
Order: PasseriformesFamily: Vireonidae

The vireos are a group of small to medium-sized passerine birds. They are typically greenish in color and resemble New World warblers apart from their heavier bills.

Yellow-throated vireo, Vireo flavifrons (A)
Red-eyed vireo, Vireo olivaceus
Black-whiskered vireo, Vireo altiloquus

Swallows
Order: PasseriformesFamily: Hirundinidae

The family Hirundinidae is adapted to aerial feeding. They have a slender streamlined body, long pointed wings, and a short bill with a wide gape. The feet are adapted to perching rather than walking, and the front toes are partially joined at the base.

Bank swallow, Riparia riparia (A)
Northern rough-winged swallow, Stelgidopteryx serripennis (A)
Caribbean martin, Progne dominicensis
White-winged swallow, Tachycineta albiventer (A)
Barn swallow, Hirundo rustica
Cliff swallow, Petrochelidon pyrrhonota (A)
Cave swallow, Petrochelidon fulva (A)

Wrens
Order: PasseriformesFamily: Troglodytidae

The wrens are mainly small and inconspicuous except for their loud songs. These birds have short wings and thin down-turned bills. Several species often hold their tails upright. All are insectivorous.

House wren, Troglodytes aedon (Ex)

Mockingbirds and thrashers
Order: PasseriformesFamily: Mimidae

The mimids are a family of passerine birds that includes thrashers, mockingbirds, tremblers, and the New World catbirds. These birds are notable for their vocalizations, especially their ability to mimic a wide variety of birds and other sounds heard outdoors. Their coloring tends towards dull-grays and browns.

White-breasted thrasher, Ramphocinclus brachyurus (Endangered)
Scaly-breasted thrasher, Allenia fusca
Pearly-eyed thrasher, Margarops fuscatus
Brown trembler, Cinclocerthia ruficauda
Gray trembler, Cinclocerthia gutturalis
Tropical mockingbird, Mimus gilvus

Thrushes and allies
Order: PasseriformesFamily: Turdidae

The thrushes are a group of passerine birds that occur mainly in the Old World. They are plump, soft-plumaged, small to medium-sized insectivores or sometimes omnivores, often feeding on the ground. Many have attractive songs.

Rufous-throated solitaire, Myadestes genibarbis
Gray-cheeked thrush, Catharus minimus (A)
Spectacled thrush, Turdus nudigenis
Red-legged thrush, Turdus plumbeus (A)

Weavers and allies
Order: PasseriformesFamily: Ploceidae

The weavers are small passerine birds related to the finches. They are seed-eating birds with rounded conical bills. The males of many species are brightly colored, usually in red or yellow and black, some species show variation in color only in the breeding season.

Village weaver, Ploceus cucullatus (I)
Northern red bishop, Euplectes franciscanus (I)

Waxbills and allies
Order: PasseriformesFamily: Estrildidae

The estrildid finches are small passerine birds of the Old World tropics and Australasia. They are gregarious and often colonial seed eaters with short thick but pointed bills. They are all similar in structure and habits, but have wide variation in plumage colors and patterns.

Bronze mannikin, Spermestes cucullata (I) (A)
Scaly-breasted munia, Lonchura punctulata (I) (A) 
Tricolored munia, Lonchura malacca (I)  
Chestnut munia, Lonchura atricapilla (I)
White-headed munia, Lonchura maja (I)
Red avadavat, Amandava amandava (I)
Orange-cheeked waxbill, Estrilda melpoda (I) (A)  
Common waxbill, Estrilda astrild (I)
Black-rumped waxbill, Estrilda troglodytes (I)

Finches, euphonias, and allies
Order: PasseriformesFamily: Fringillidae

Finches are seed-eating passerine birds, that are small to moderately large and have a strong beak, usually conical and in some species very large. All have twelve tail feathers and nine primaries. These birds have a bouncing flight with alternating bouts of flapping and gliding on closed wings, and most sing well.

Antillean euphonia, Chlorophonia musica (A)

Troupials and allies
Order: PasseriformesFamily: Icteridae

The icterids are a group of small to medium-sized, often colorful, passerine birds restricted to the New World and include the grackles, New World blackbirds, and New World orioles. Most species have black as the predominant plumage color, often enlivened by yellow, orange, or red.

Bobolink, Dolichonyx oryzivorus (A)
Martinique oriole, Icterus bonana (endemic) (vulnerable)
Baltimore oriole, Icterus galbula (A)
Shiny cowbird, Molothrus bonariensis (A)
Carib grackle, Quiscalus lugubris

New World warblers
Order: PasseriformesFamily: Parulidae

The New World warblers are a group of small, often colorful, passerine birds restricted to the New World. Most are arboreal, but some are terrestrial. Most members of this family are insectivores.

Ovenbird, Seiurus aurocapilla (A)
Louisiana waterthrush, Parkesia motacilla (A)
Northern waterthrush, Parkesia noveboracensis (A)
Black-and-white warbler, Mniotilta varia
Prothonotary warbler, Protonotaria citrea (A)
Kentucky warbler, Geothlypis formosa (A)
Hooded warbler, Setophaga citrina (A)
American redstart, Setophaga ruticilla (A)
Cape May warbler, Setophaga tigrina (A)
Northern parula, Setophaga americana (A)
Yellow warbler, Setophaga petechia
Blackpoll warbler, Setophaga striata (A) (near-threatened)
Pine warbler, Setophaga pinus (A)
Yellow-rumped warbler, Setophaga coronata (A)
Prairie warbler, Setophaga discolor (A)
St. Lucia warbler, Setophaga delicata (A)
Black-throated green warbler, Setophaga virens (A)
Canada warbler, Cardellina canadensis (A)

Cardinals and allies
Order: PasseriformesFamily: Cardinalidae

The cardinals are a family of robust, seed-eating birds with strong bills. They are typically associated with open woodland. The sexes usually have distinct plumages.

Summer tanager, Piranga rubra (A)
Scarlet tanager, Piranga olivacea (A)
Rose-breasted grosbeak, Pheucticus ludovicianus (A)

Tanagers and allies
Order: PasseriformesFamily: Thraupidae

The tanagers are a large group of small to medium-sized passerine birds restricted to the New World, mainly in the tropics. Many species are brightly colored. As a family they are omnivorous, but individual species specialize in eating fruits, seeds, insects, or other types of food. Most have short, rounded wings.

Grassland yellow-finch, Sicalis luteola (I)
Chestnut-bellied seed-finch, Sporophila angolensis (I)  
Bananaquit, Coereba flaveola
Lesser Antillean bullfinch, Loxigilla noctis  
Black-faced grassquit, Melanospiza bicolor
Lesser Antillean saltator, Saltator albicollis

Notes

References

See also
List of birds
Lists of birds by region

Martinique
 
Birds